The gare de Rodez is a railway station in Rodez, Occitanie, France. The station is on the Capdenac–Rodez, Castelnaudary–Rodez and Sévérac-le-Château–Rodez lines. The station is served by Intercités de nuit (night train) and TER (local) services operated by SNCF.

Train services
The following services currently call at Rodez:
night services (Intercités de nuit) Paris–Orléans–Figeac–Rodez–Albi
local service (TER Occitanie) Toulouse–Albi–Rodez
local service (TER Occitanie) Brive-la-Gaillarde–Figeac–Rodez

Train services between Rodez and Millau were suspended in 2017, and are expected to be resumed in 2026. As a replacement, TER Occitanie bus services to Millau are offered.

References

Railway stations in Aveyron
Railway stations in France opened in 1860